Self Aid was an unemployment benefit concert held in Dublin, Ireland on 17 May 1986. The concert performances were primarily by Irish musicians, although Elvis Costello and Chris Rea, both Englishmen of Irish descent, were designated "honorary Irishmen" for the day; the event was promoted by Jim Aiken. The concert included the last performance by The Boomtown Rats until they reformed in 2013.

The purpose of the concert was to highlight the chronic unemployment problem in Ireland at the time, with nearly 250,000 people unemployed. The 14-hour concert was the largest that had ever been staged in Ireland. All musicians that took part donated their time free of charge. All profits from the concert and subsequent album, Live for Ireland, went to the Self Aid Trust. The telethon raised millions of pounds for a job creation trust fund as well as over 1000 job pledges. The song chosen for the finale was "Let's Make it Work", written by Christy Moore and Dublin songwriter Paul Doran. Tributes were paid to Phil Lynott who had died just 4 months earlier, including a performance by a reformed Thin Lizzy with Gary Moore on lead vocals.

The concept of the concert — job creation through pledges — attracted criticism both at the time and subsequently, with critics claiming that no jobs had actually arisen as a result other than vacancies that already existed.

Concert performers
The line-up included: 
Auto Da Fé
Bagatelle
Big Self
Blue in Heaven
The Boomtown Rats
Paul Brady
Chris de Burgh
Cactus World News
The Chieftains
Clannad
De Dannan
Elvis Costello
Rory Gallagher
The Fountainhead
In Tua Nua
Christy Moore
Van Morrison
Moving Hearts
The Pogues
Chris Rea
Scullion
Brush Shiels
Stockton's Wing
Thin Lizzy
Those Nervous Animals
U2

Live For Ireland songs
 Maggie's Farm - U2 (6:46)
 Seven into the Sea - In Tua Nua (3:53)
 Many Rivers to Cross - Elvis Costello and the Attractions (2:41)
 Dirty Old Town - The Pogues (3:45)
 Don't Pay the Ferryman - Chris DeBurgh (3:32)
 Harry's Game - Clannad (2:32)
 The Bridge - Cactus World News (4:19)
 Looking after No. 1 - The Boomtown Rats (4:50) [not on US release]
 Here Comes the Night - Van Morrison (3:58)
 Don't Believe a Word - Thin Lizzy (2:23) [not on US release]
 Steel River - Chris Rea (4:48)
 Make it Work - Christy Moore / Paul Doran (Larry Mullen) (3:13)
 The Lark - Moving Hearts (5:35)
 The Island - Paul Brady (5:09)
 Feel it Now - The Fountainhead (5:01)
 Exiles - Auto Da Fe (5:17)

Alternate tracks on US release
 Boil the Breakfast Early - The Chieftains
 Joey's on the Street Again - The Boomtown Rats

Alternate tracks on double vinyl/cassette release
 My Friend John - Those Nervous Animals
 A Sense of Freedom - Les Enfants
 The Arrival of Queen Sheeba in Galway - De Dannan
 Old Pal - Brush Shiels
 Rock 'N' Roll Fantasy - Bagatelle
 Keep on Climbin' - Freddie White
 Tell Me - Blue in Heaven
 Follow Me - Rory Gallagher
 Carol - Scullion
 Leave My Kitten Alone - Elvis Costello and the Attractions
 Skidoo - Stockton's Wing
 Independence - Big Self

Note: There have been multiple versions of this album, with varying tracks, in different formats and across different territories

References

External links
 Live For Ireland album

1980s in Irish music
Benefit concerts
Music in Dublin (city)